Dimitrios "Mimis" Papaioannou (23 August 1942 – 15 March 2023) was a Greek professional footballer, who played as a forward, mostly for AEK Athens and a later manager. His nickname was "The Vlach", due to his refugee origins. Throughout his entire career, Papaioannou was never shown a single red card, showing the prudence and integrity of his character. Papaioannou was considered to be the best Greek footballer of his generation and one of the best Greek footballers of all time, being awarded  the best Greek footballer of the 20th Century by IFFHS. In 2021, the IFFHS also chose him in Greece's best XI of all time.

Early life
Papaioannou was born on 23 August 1942 in Nea Nikomedeia of Imathia. His father, Kostas was the curator of the local football team Nea Genea, thus the young Papaioannou came in touch with football from an early age. His football talent began to shine from early on, while his love for football was unquestionable. His love of football and the financial difficulties of his family forced him to leave school early and split his time between the stadium and the barber shop in the village, where he worked as an assistant.

Club career

Early career
At the age of 15 he joined Nea Genea and played in the team's offense. His name and abilities quickly became known in the capital of the prefecture, Veria and to the agents of the local club, as a result of which he transferred to them in 1959, at the age of 17. His appearances for the "Queen of North" aroused the interest of the big teams of Thessaloniki, but also of the then coach of AEK Athens, Tryfon Tzanetis. The offers of the clubs of Thessaloniki did not meet the requirements of Veria and in fact his transfer to PAOK failed for a difference of 20,000 drachmas. In 1961, Tzanetis suggested and persuaded the owner of AEK, Nikos Goumas to offer 175,000 drachmas to the team and 25,000 drachmas to the 19-year-old player for his transfer to their club. The young striker of refugee origin was hesitant, as on the one hand there was his sporting sympathy for the northern Greece, PAOK and the neighboring move to Thessaloniki, while on the other hand there was the greater name of AEK Athens and the money he was offered were more than an immediate need for his family, with prerequisite his move to the distant Athens, but eventually after the advice of the president of Veria, Kostas Vorgiatzidis, Papaioannou chose the club of Athens.

AEK Athens

1962–1963
In the summer of 1962, the 20-year-old Papaioannou was dressed in the yellow-black jersey, starting an integral course of 17 years that elevated him to one of the greatest players in the history of AEK Athens. He was the player that AEK was looking to pair up with Kostas Nestoridis and lead the club in claiming leagues. Alongside "Nestoras" they formed an incredible attacking duo that was proved deadly for the opposing defences. On 27 September 1962 he scored his first goal on his debut in a 7–2 triumph against Egaleo. He scored in the derby against Olympiacos at Karaiskakis Stadium, in the 1–3 victory on 23 December 1962, while he also scored in the same match of the second round. At the end of the season, AEK was tied on the 1st place with Panathinaikos and the title was judged in a play-off match on 23 June 1963. Papaioannou scored twice, Nestoridis also scored from a direct corner kick and after a 3–3 draw according to the regulations of the time, the title was awarded to the team with the best goal ratio in the regular season. The 39 goals scored by the two clubs and the total goal difference of 66–21, led AEK to win the league after 23 years. As Mimis Papaioannou had stated, after the end of the match, as he saw all the members of the team in the locker room crying for this success, he was grafted as a newcomer with the club's ideals, while he also cried and became a supporter of AEK.

1963–1965
The upcoming years for AEK and Papaioannou were almost ideal, as he showed that he was the one to take the leader role from Nestoridis in the team, pushing them as high as he could to lead them to success. His appearances and achievements put him quickly in the heart of the crowd. The fans adored him and he rewarded them with passion for the yellow-black jersey. On 29 September 1963 he scored a brace in the away defeat with 5–4 against Panathinaikos. He scored his first hat-trick on 16 October 1963 scoring all three goals against Aris at home. It did not take him long enough to score another one, as he did 2 months later against Ethnikos Piraeus in a 4–0 win. Papaioannou scored a goal in the imposing 6–1 against Olympiacos on 6 January 1964. He also scored 4 of the total of 7 goals of his team against Anagennisi Arta for the Cup, on 26 April 1964. At the end of the season he won his first Cup with AEK, even though the final was scratched due to the suspension of the semi-finalists, Panathinaikos and Olympiacos from the competition. In 1964 he ended the season as the league's top scorer with 29 goals, ending the 5-year winning streak of Nestoridis.

On 31 January Papaioannou scored a hat-trick against Panachaiki in a 6–0 home win for the league. He also scored the winner in an episodic derby against Olympiacos away from home, that ended 1–2 for AEK. He scored again with the same opponent, opening the score in a 3–3 draw at home, on the final matchday.

Career break and singing
Οn 12 May 1965, the legendary Real Madrid player, Ferenc Puskás, who saw Papaioannou scoring a brace against the Spanish "Queen" in the friendly 3–3 at Nea Filadelfeia, suggested to the management of Real the acquisition of the Greek forward. The proposal of Real Madrid to AEK was unrealistic for the Greek standards of the time. The Castigians offered AEK 4,000,000 drachmas and 750,000 drachmas to the player for his move to Madrid. The huge salary and the prospect of a football career far from Greece's standards in Spain ignited Mimis' desire for the transfer, but that desire was never fulfilled, due to the fear of the management for the reaction of the fans to a possible departure of Papaioannou. Nevertheless, Papaioannou was willing to leave AEK under the given punishment of a one-year ban and then sign as free agent at Real, but the Spaniards refused, as they didn't want to disrupt their relations with the Greek club.

His anger was such, that he was about to abandon football. Afterwards, Papaioannou was approached by a folk composer and bouzouki player Christos Nikolopoulos, who brought him in contact with Stelios Kazantzidis. Mimis and Stelios have unlimited mutual respect and admiration for each other's abilities and Kazantzidis discovered that Papaioannou, in addition to his footballing skills, had also a very good singing voice and suggested that he follow him to concerts in Germany alongside Marinella. Mimis accepted and went to Germany, singing to the Greek immigrants of the country. After two months and despite vocal competence of Papaioannou, Kazantzidis, realizing the "crime" of the departure of Mimis from football, persuaded him to return to AEK and mediated himself with the administration in order for Papaioannou to sign a very satisfactory contract of 500,000 drachmas per season at the start of the December 1965. His singing career was limited to the recording of seven songs by Stelios Kazantzidis and Christos Nikolopoulos between 1971 and 1972. Among them was the recording on 19 June 1971 of the famous "Hymn of AEK" to music by Stelios Kazantzidis and lyrics by Christos Kolokotronis.

Return to AEK Athens

1965–1966
Papaioannou returned to his two great loves, AEK and football and became the undisputed leader of the team, after the departure of Nestoridis. In his first match after his return, on 19 December 1965, he scored in the 3–2 of the yellow-blacks against Panathinaikos at Leoforos Alexandras Stadium. Papaioannou scored five hat-tricks in this season: one in a 6–0 victory against Niki Volos on 6 March 1966, the other against PAOK in a 5–1 win, against Panionios with the same score against Egaleo with the score reaching 4–1 and against Edessaikos for the Cup. He also scored in the derby against Panathinaikos on 3 April 1966, but his goal didn't count as the game was suspended and eventually awarded to the greens. At the end of the season, he emerged again as the league's top scorer with 23 goals.

1966–1967
The next season Papaioannou led the double-headed eagle in the final of the Balkans Cup scoring 2 goals against Lokomotiv Sofia, 2 goals against Farul Constanța and 1 goal against Vardar. In the first leg of the final in October 1967 against Fenerbahçe, his goal in their 2–1 victory, was not enough in claiming the title, as the Turkish tied the score in the second leg and sent the tie to a decider match in 1968 which they also won by 3–1, where Papaioannou was the scorer for his team. Papaioannou also scored once in the away defeat against Braga, for the UEFA Cup Winners' Cup, on 5 October 1966. On 29 January 1967 he scored the decider against Olympiacos in the dying minutes, while in the same match of the second round, he opened the score in the final 1–1 away draw.

1967–1968
On 22 October 1967 he equalized the goal by Domazos and shaped the final 1–1 against Panathinaikos. On 12 November he scored a hat-trick against Panserraikos in a 4–0 win at home. Papaioannou scored a brace at the away 4–1 victory against Olympiacos. He scored his second hat-trick of the season, on 21 January 1968, against Vyzas Megara in a 6–1 home win. He also scored the winner in a 2–1 win over Panathinaikos. For the 1967–68 Balkans Cup, he scored in a 3–3 draw against Olimpija Ljubljana. Papaioannou celebrated his second championship with AEK at the end of the season, while also qualifying for the first time in their history to the European Cup.

1968–1969
On 18 September 1968, Papaioannou scored in AEK's first win in the European Cup, opening the score in the 3–0 over Jeunesse Esch. On 27 October 1968 in Faliro against Olympiacos, while they were leading 3–2 with Papaioannou scoring once, after dismissal of the goalkeeper, Serafidis for kicking Sideris, the coach of AEK at the time, Branko Stanković decided not to make a substitution, sending Papaioannou to play as the goalkeeper for the remaining 5 minutes of the match. Papaioannou kept the post in tact, even making two great saves. On 3 November 1968 he scored the fastest hat-trick ever achieved by an AEK player within 12 minutes, in the 5–2 win against Chalkida. As AEK advanced in the second round of the European Cup, he scored with an impressive header, at their first away win in the institution by 2–0, for the 2nd leg against AB, securing the club's qualification to quarter-finals. After successfully leading the yellow-blacks to the European Cup quarter-finals, he scored equalizing the score in the second leg against Spartak Trnava, but the goal that would send them to the extra time after 2–1 loss at home, never came and AEK were eliminated. That was the greatest season of a Greek club at the time, in a European competition. On 14 May 1968 he scored another hat-trick at a Cup game against Lamia in a 5–0 win.

1969–1971
On 8 February 1970, Papaioannou won his team the match against Olympiacos at home, by scoring the only goal of the match. In the round of 32 of the Cup on 22 March, he opened the score against Panathinaikos, while also having a shot hit the crossbar, in an episodic 1–1 draw that was decided at the penalties with AEK losing by 3–5 and Papaioannou missing his penalty.

On 30 September 1970 he scored 4 goals in AEK's 10–0 triumph against the lower division side, Agia Eleousa for the Cup. The double-headed eagle made their highest scoring victory in the league on 4 December 1970, beating Veria by 8–2, with Papaioannou scoring a hat-trick to his former club. On 7 March 1971 he scored again a hat-trick against EPA Larnaca in a 3–0 win at home and three weeks later he scored another one in the 4–0 victory over OFI. Papaioannou led his club to the conquest of another championship, where he lost the top scorer award by a single goal from Georgios Dedes, scoring 27 goals in the league.

1971–1974
The following season, he scored in both league games against Olympiacos equalizing in the matches that both ended in 1–1. Papaioannou scored in the epic 3–2 home win against Internazionale on 29 September 1971, for the 2nd leg of the first round of the European Cup.

From the previous season AEK was beginning to struggle financially and the administrative disputes appeared within the club, resulted in a series of issues. Those issues marked the start of a declining period for AEK. In 1974 the club finished 5th and did not qualify for any European competition, while Stanković was sacked at the midseason. Papaioannou continued to lead the club during the hard times, as they had a decent presence in the UEFA Cup, where they reached the second round and were eliminated by the great Liverpool of Bill Shankly.

ΑΕΚ continued their bad campaigns, as they finished for the second consecutive year in 5th place for the league, while in the Cup they were eliminated at the round of 16. It was characteristic that the situation at the club was affecting the performances of Papaioannou as, he recorded his lowest until then performance, with 7 goals in all competitions.

1974–1976
As the ownership of the club passed to Loukas Barlos, the team entered into a glorious period, with Papaiannou leading the club to titles and distinctions. In the competitive regeneration of the club under František Fadrhonc and with the transfers of Walter Wagner, Christos Ardizoglou, Tasos Konstantinou and Giorgos Dedes in their offense, Papaioannou raised his performances. He scored a 4–3 victory against Panathinaikos on 20 April 1975. AEK finished at the second place in the league, just 2 points behind Olympiacos.

In the next season, AEK faced Vojvodina in the first round of the UEFA Cup, where Papaioannou scored once in the 3–1 win in the second leg, on 1 October 1975. On 2 November 1975, he scored a hat-trick in the Cup game, where AEK prevailed over Agios Dimitrios with 7–0. One week later, with his 2 goals Papaioannou, formed the 2–0 win, in the away match against Olympiacos.

1976–1977
In the summer of 1976 after the "yellow-blacks" were strengthened by the additions of Nikos Christidis, Takis Nikoloudis and the great Thomas Mavros, they played amazing football. Fadrhonc, considering the playing intelligence and high technical qualities in the playing style of Papaioannou, decided to relocate him as a "classic number 10" in order to fit all the great attackers the club had to offer. Papaioannou responded successfully as a playmaker, while maintaining his scoring abilities. In the first round of the UEFA Cup, AEK faced Dynamo Moscow, where Papaioannou scored in the 2–0 of the first leg on 15 September 1976. In the episodic second leg on 29 September 1976 that was sent to the extra time, after AEK won a penalty in the last minute and Konstantinou who went to take it, given the order by Papaiannou to finish the job, calmly sent the ball into the net and the goalkeeper in the oppostie direction. After beating Derby County in both legs of the second round and became the first club in European tournaments' history to achieve a victory in English ground, they faced Red Star Belgrade, where Papaioannou opened the score in the first leg on the 2–0 victory on 24 November 1976. In the quarter-finals he helped his team tie the 3–0 defeat of the first leg against QPR, scoring a goal in the regular time and sending the match to penalties. He scored the winning penalty leading the club to the semi-finals. AEK Athens glorious campaign in the UEFA Cup ended after losing to the legendary Juventus of Giovanni Trapattoni, who eventually won the tournament.

1977–1978
In the next season the acquisition of Dušan Bajević and the formation of an outstanding attacking duo with Thomas Mavros, while Papaioannou orchestrated the attack, made the team's offense unstoppable. Fadrhonc was sacked in the beginning of the season after 3 years of presence, but his replacement Zlatko Čajkovski also did an excellent job. On 28 September 1977 he scored in the second leg of the first round of the UEFA Cup against ASA Târgu Mureș, where AEK qualified with a score of 3–0, while at the second round their campaign was cut short by Standard Liège. At the end of the season, with Papaioannou as their captain, they won easily the domestic double by winning the league with just 2 defeats, as well as the Cup going undefeated while beating Panathinaikos in the second round, tearing apart Olympiacos by 6–1 in the semi-finals and prevailing against PAOK by 2–0 in the final.

1978–1979
After a completely successful season, Barlos after taking the approval of Papaioannou added to the star roster of the club the other "Mimis", by sigining Panathinaikos' legendary captain, Domazos alongside Ferenc Puskás, now as a coach, who both led the "greens" to the European Cup Final in 1971. During the season AEK were unstoppable with only three defeats in the league and played some of the most spectacular football that the team had ever played, as they tore their opponents apart with large margin wins, achieving the league's best offense with a total of 90 goals. The advanced age of Papaioannou and the great performances of his teammates, did not allow him this time to be the lead player of the club. He passed that role to Mavros, who that season became the top scorer in the league with 31 goals and 40 in total in the season, winning the European Silver Shoe, just 3 goals behind Kees Kist. Papaioannou won his last championship with AEK after they were tied in first place with Olympiacos and the latter did not came to play the play-off match, that was set for the title. However, AEK lost the chance to win a second domestic double in a row as they lost the Cup Final AEK against Panionios who overturned the 1–0 lead of the "yellow-blacks" and won by 3–1 the first Cup of their history. That year marked the last season of Papaioannou at the club. On 6 June 1979, AEK organized a friendly match at Nea Filadelfeia against PAOK in his honour. Players from the elite of the Greek football, such as Vasilis Hatzipanagis, Antonis Antoniadis and Georgios Firos, as well as foreign players, such as Walter Schachner and Kurt Jara, wore the yellow-black shirt to honour Papaioannou, in a 3–2 loss by the team of Thessaloniki.

Papaioannou was an emblematic and the most effective leader of the club who managed to lead them to 5 Championships, 3 Cups, including a domestic double in 1978. He has been for AEK and Greek football a symbol of morale and loyalty to the team, as staying with the same team for over a decade and never seeing a red card in his entire career, while he was marked with a yellow card only three times. In his 17-year spell with AEK, he became the club's all-time top scorer and by the time he left AEK he was also the league's all-time top scorer, a record broken 11 years later by Mavros. Papaioannou today is the 3rd place of the all-time top scorers of the Greek Championship. He holds the record of most goals scored in the derbies against Panathinaikos with 10 goals, while he is second, behind Mavros at the same record in the derbies against Olympiacos with 14 goals. He was the player with the most appearances in all official competitions with the double-headed eagle, until he was surpassed by Stelios Manolas, however Papaioannou holds record of the games played in league with 480 appearances. Until today, he is sixth in appearances for the Greek Championship.

Retirement
After leaving AEK in the summer of 1979, the 37-year-old Papaioannou went in the United States to play for the New York Pancyprian-Freedoms. After a successful three-year spell, Papaioannou ended his great career as a football player, at the age of 40.

In January 1999, the combination of all his virtues and talents, was recognized by the IFFHS, where he was named the Top Greek Footballer of the 20th Century.

International career
Papaioannou was part of the Greek military team from 1962 to 1965. He managed to win two consecutive times the World Military Cup in 1962 and 1963.

Papaioannou was capped 61 times with Greece scoring 21 goals becoming their top scorer, at the time, until Anastopoulos surpassed him in 1986 and now he is among the top 5 goalscorers. His debut was on 27 November 1963 in a friendly away 3–1 loss against Cyprus, under Tzanetis. Although it was the first international match of Papaioannou was the captain of Greece.

Managerial career
Papaioannou, after leaving AEK in 1979, went in the USA as a player-coach for New York Pancyprian-Freedoms, where he won a double in the League and Cup. He remained there until 1986 initially as a player, then as a player-coach and eventually only as a coach. Although he was approaching the age of 40, in 1981 he attracted the interest of the top professional league in the US, NASL, but he had already decided to retire.

After his return to Greece in 1986, some coaching attempts at clubs such as Kerkyra, Edessaikos, AE Kos and Pannafpliakos were not crowned with success. In 1991 Papaioannou moved to Kefalonia, where he was active professionally and at the time coached the local team of Evgeros, which were promoted from the local championships to the fourth division. He also coached divisions of the national team of Greece and was at the side of Alketas Panagoulias in the Men's team, as an assistant, at the 1994 FIFA World Cup in the USA.

After football
In December 2011, the autobiography of Papaiannou, entitled "Date in the Air" was published by NIKAS publications and edited by Dimitras Apostolias. He visited schools and gave speeches about football, while he presented in tournaments held for school students. Papaiannou also competed with the veterans of AEK and played football on a five-a-side football field to keep in shape. His wax figure is in the new Agia Sophia Stadium museum with other wax effigies of people who have connected their name with AEK from various positions. His name also is honoured on one of the four pillars of the Stadum, alongside other important figures of the club's history such as Kostas Nestoridis, Stelios Serafidis and Thomas Mavros.

Death
On 15 March 2023, Papaioannou died at the age of 80 after a long-term struggle with health issues. His funeral took place on 17 March at Nea Filadelfeia, where great figures of the past and the present of the Greek football attended to "farewell" him for the last time. At the same time, at the Agia Sophia Stadium, the flags were waving at half mast, while the figure of Papaioannou was placed on the external matrix of the stadium.

On March 19, in the home match against Panathinaikos, the matrixes of the stadium showed clips from old interviews, while the team's anthemn was playing and the fans of AEK before the start of the game raised a card stunt in his memory. Afterwards, a minute's silence was observed in the center of the field by the people of both teams.

Style of play

The playing style of Papaioannou was characterized by technique, dribbling, strength and versatility in his finishing, scoring spectacular goals, that made him a difficult opponent to play against. His strong foot was his left, but he scored with both legs. He had a unique jumping ability, staying in the air longer than his opponents and beat them in aerial duels. Despite his small stature of 1.68 meters, he scored over 50 headers in official matches. His headers were described as shots with the head. Οn 12 May 1965, at the 46th minute, during the 3–3 draw in a friendly match against Real Madrid, the central defender José Santamaría was stunned, not believing that the Greek player had just jumped "to the stars" and sent the ball into the net, making the score 3–1. Papaioannou was exceptionally good at free-kicks and he also scored twice from direct corner kicks. His leadership skills and ability to inspire his teammates resulted in making the team give everything they got on the pitch. His playing intelligence and technical ability got him to be converted from a striker to an attacking midfielder, considering his physical condition at the time and in order to fit in with all the great players in the team's offense. He adapted quickly in his new role, while the change of his position kept him in a high level, as despite his offensive skills, he also had good through passes and crosses, creating a lot of scoring chances for his teammates.

Singing career
The 7 songs with the voice of Mimis Papaioannou were recorded on Polyphone during the period 1971–1972 with the collaboration of Christos Nikolopoulos and Stelios Kazantzidis:

  - St. Kazantzidis, G. Vassilopoulos (1971)
  - St. Kazantzidis, Chr. Kolokotronis (recorded 19 June 1971)
  - St. Kazantzidis, G. Vassilopoulos (1971)
  - Chr. Nikolopoulos, Pythagoras (1971)
  - St. Kazantzidis, Evag. Atraidis (1972)
  - St. Kazantzidis, Evag. Atraidis (1972)
  - Chr. Nikolopoulos, G. Vassilopoulos (1972)

Career statistics

Club

International

Scores and results list Greece's goal tally first, score column indicates score after each Papaioannou goal.

Honours

As a player
AEK Athens
Alpha Ethniki: 1962–63, 1967–68, 1970–71, 1977–78, 1978–79
Greek Cup: 1963–64, 1965–66, 1977–78

New York Pancyprian-Freedoms
Cosmopolitan Soccer League: 1980
National Challenge Cup: 1980

Greece military 
World Military Cup: 1962, 1963

Individual
Alpha Ethniki top scorer: 1963–64, 1965–66
Best Greek footballer of the 20th Century

As a coach
New York Pancyprian-Freedoms
Cosmopolitan Soccer League: 1982
National Challenge Cup: 1982, 1983

References

External links
Mimis Papaioannou at phantis.com

1942 births
2023 deaths
People from Imathia
Greek footballers
Greece international footballers
Association football forwards
AEK Athens F.C. players
Super League Greece players
Cosmopolitan Soccer League players
Veria F.C. players
New York Pancyprian-Freedoms players
Footballers from Central Macedonia
Expatriate soccer players in the United States
Greek expatriate sportspeople in the United States
PAE Kerkyra managers
Chalkida F.C. managers